Yevgeni Yevgenyevich Kalinin (born 19 March 1955) is a former Russian football player and coach.

References

1955 births
Sportspeople from Grodno
Living people
Soviet footballers
FC Neman Grodno players
FC Dynamo Saint Petersburg players
Russian footballers
FC Luch Vladivostok players
Russian Premier League players
Association football goalkeepers
FC Lokomotiv Kaluga players
FC Tekstilshchik Ivanovo players